Naandi may refer to:

 Naandi (film), 1964 Kannada-language film
 Naandri, Meendum Varuga, a Tamil language film
 Naandi language, a Kalenjin language of Kenya
Naandhi, 2021 Telugu-language film

See also
 Nandi (disambiguation)